Ricardo Samuel Lucarelli Santos de Souza (born 14 February 1992) is a Brazilian professional volleyball player. He is a member of the Brazil national team. The 2016 Olympic Champion, a silver medallist at the 2014 World Championship, 2019 World Cup winner, and a four–time South American Champion (2013, 2015, 2017 and 2021). At the professional club level, he plays for Gas Sales Piacenza.

Career

Clubs
In 2010 he started playing for Minas Tênis Clube. In 2013 he signed a contract with SESI São Paulo, and in 2015 he was hired by the club Funvic Taubaté.

National team
The young Lucarelli defended the junior national team in 2010, winning the gold medal in the South American Championship. The following year, he was in the group that finished fifth in the World Championship.
In 2013 Lucarelli won the World Grand Champions Cup, a gold medal at the South American Championship and a silver medal at the World League, where he was named the Best Outside Spiker (together with Ivan Zaytsev). In 2014 he was a major player in the Brazilian team, which won the silver medal at the World League 2014 in Florence, Italy. He was again named the Best Outside Spiker, together with teammate Murilo Endres.
Lucarelli was one of the Bernardinho team's starters; Lucarelli was on the court in all the games of the FIVB World League and the conquest of the South American Games in 2015. In the special year of 2016, Lucarelli was a key player in the gold medal campaign at the Rio Olympic Games.
Lucarelli was part of the team that won the gold medal at the 2016 Olympic Games in Rio de Janeiro. He played the last three games against Argentina (quarterfinals), Russia (semifinals), and Italy (finals).

Honours

Clubs
 CSV South American Club Championship
  Belo Horizonte 2013 – with Minas Tênis Clube
  Taubate 2016 – with Vôlei Taubaté
 FIVB Club World Championship
  Brazil 2021 – with Cucine Lube Civitanova
 National championships
 2018/2019  Brazilian Championship, with Vôlei Taubaté
 2022/2023  Italian Cup, with Gas Sales Bluenergy Piacenza

Youth national team
 2013  FIVB U23 World Championship

Individual awards
 2009: FIVB U19 World Championship – Best Receiver
 2013: CSV South American  Club Championship – Best Server
 2013: FIVB U23 World Championship – Most Valuable Player
 2013: FIVB World League – Best Outside Spiker
 2013: CSV South American Championship – Best Outside Spiker
 2014: FIVB World League – Best Outside Spiker
 2014: FIVB World Championship – Best Outside Spiker
 2016: CSV South American  Club Championship – Best Outside Spiker
 2016: Olympic Games – Best Outside Spiker
 2017: FIVB World League – Best Outside Spiker
 2017: CSV South American Championship – Best Outside Spiker
 2017: FIVB World Grand Champions Cup – Best Outside Spiker
 2017: FIVB World Grand Champions Cup – Most Valuable Player
 2021: CSV South American Championship – Best Outside Spiker

References

External links

 
 Player profile at LegaVolley.it   
 Player profile at Volleybox.net
 
 

1992 births
Living people
People from Contagem
Sportspeople from Minas Gerais
Brazilian men's volleyball players
Olympic volleyball players of Brazil
Volleyball players at the 2016 Summer Olympics
Volleyball players at the 2020 Summer Olympics
Medalists at the 2016 Summer Olympics
Olympic medalists in volleyball
Olympic gold medalists for Brazil
Brazilian expatriate sportspeople in Italy
Expatriate volleyball players in Italy
Trentino Volley players
Outside hitters